Pseudosphex nivaca is a moth of the subfamily Arctiinae. It was described by E. Dukinfield Jones in 1914. It is found in Rio Grande do Sul, Brazil.

References

Pseudosphex